Pellaea may refer to one of two different genera:

Pellaea (bug), a genus of stink bugs.
Pellaea (plant), a genus of ferns.